Thomas Edmund Malcolm Chessell (1 April 1914 – 9 May 1992) was an Australian Olympic-level rower.

Birth and education
Tom Chessell was born in Ashfield, New South Wales, and attended Newington College (1929–1931) where he started rowing.  As a cox he represented Newington at the Head of the River in the 2nd IV in 1930 and the 1st VIII in the following year.

Building career
Forced by the Great Depression to leave school, Chessell worked for his family's building company and studied building at Sydney Technical College.
He worked in the building industry all his life and was Chief Building Inspector for Ku-ring-gai Council on his retirement in 1975.

War service
At the outbreak of World War II, Chessell joined the RAAF as a carpenter/rigger serving in the Middle East for two and a half years and was mentioned in dispatches. He returned to Australia to complete officer training and attained the rank of pilot officer. In 1945, shortly before war's end, he married.

Rowing career

After leaving school, Chessell joined Sydney Rowing Club.

Chessell's first state selection for New South Wales came at aged 36 in 1950 in the men's senior eight contesting the King's Cup at the annual Australian Interstate Regatta. Chessell steered the 1950 New South Wales eight who won the King's Cup. He coxed further New South Wales King's Cup eights in 1951 and 1952. The 1951 crew won by a blistering four length margin.

For the 1952 Helsinki Olympics an all New South Wales crew was selected twelve months in advance based on the 1951 King's Cup result. The Olympic selection crew raced the 1952 King's Cup for New South Wales during its preparation and was comprehensively beaten by Victoria. The media then claimed the Victorian crew should be nominated instead. However the selector Joe Gould stuck with the selected crew since a number of them including stroke Phil Cayzer, had severe adverse reactions to the vaccinations they'd taken for overseas travel. It was also mentioned that their fundraising responsibilities, some 7,000 pounds, impacted their preparation – the Australian Olympic Federation had only been able to fund four air tickets for the eight. Chessell was the coxswain of that Australian Olympic men's eight who to their credit won the bronze medal in Helsinki.

Death
Having retired to Surfers Paradise, Queensland, Chessell died on Chevron Island, survived by his wife and two sons, Ian and Bruce. He was cremated and his ashes were spread on the Parramatta River by the 1952 Olympic eight with Ian Chessell as cox.

References

1914 births
1992 deaths
People educated at Newington College
Coxswains (rowing)
Australian male rowers
Rowers at the 1952 Summer Olympics
Olympic medalists in rowing
Olympic rowers of Australia
Olympic bronze medalists for Australia
Medalists at the 1952 Summer Olympics
20th-century Australian people